The Kulturinsel Halle is a building and cultural complex in Halle (Saale). Furthermore, it includes the gastronomic establishments Café nt and Strieses Biertunnel.

History  
The Kulturinsel Halle was built between 1980 and 2002, starting from the old Kino der Deutsch-Sowjetischen Freundschaft (Cinema of German-Soviet Friendship), a whole block of eight buildings was converted and expanded into a cultural venue. It was shaped by the long-time artistic director Peter Sodann, who found a venue here in the cinema for his ensemble at the time. In 1999, Peter Sodann received the prize of the Association of German Critics for the project "Kulturinsel".

There was already a Neues Theater in Halle before that, founded in 1870. After a fire in 1902, it was run by  until 1912, after which it was a warehouse.

Current situation 

References

External links 
 
 

Halle (Saale)
Theatres in Germany